Brandi Wells (May 13, 1955 – March 24, 2003) was an American singer, songwriter, recording artist and entertainer.

Born Marguerite J. Pinder in Chester, Pennsylvania, one of the five daughters of Thomas and Dorothy (née Williams) Pinder, and educated in the Chester Upland School District. She sang with Fat Larry's Band, Breeze, and Slick before starting a solo career. Her debut album, Watch Out, appeared in 1981 on Fantasy Records and reached #37 on the US Billboard R&B chart. The title track charted at #27 on the US Hot R&B/Hip-Hop Songs chart and #16 on the US Hot Dance Club Songs chart. It also peaked at #74 in the UK Singles Chart in February 1982. "Watch Out" proved to be her only hit, though she released a follow-up LP in 1985.

Marriage
Wells also had four stepchildren: Janay Graham, Janine Graham, Ronald E. Bannister III and Juakira Gordon, and one grandchild.

Death
Brandi Wells was 47 years of age when she died at the Crozer-Chester Medical Center in Chester, Pennsylvania on March 24, 2003 from breast cancer.  She is interred at the Haven Memorial Cemetery in Chester, Pennsylvania.

Discography
Watch Out (Fantasy Records, 1981)
21st Century Fox (Omni Records, 1985)

References

1955 births
2003 deaths
American rhythm and blues singers
Musicians from Philadelphia
People from Chester, Pennsylvania
Deaths from cancer in Pennsylvania
Deaths from breast cancer
Singers from Pennsylvania
20th-century American singers
20th-century American women singers
21st-century American women